Zarghan (also Romanized as Zarghan and Zaraqān; also known as Zirghān) is a village in Joghatai Rural District, in the Central District of Joghatai County, Razavi Khorasan Province, Iran. At the 2006 census, its population was 1,964, in 563 families.

References 

Populated places in Joghatai County